Dirty laundry (or dirty linen) refers to embarrassing private matters that one would prefer not be made public. Dirty Laundry may also refer to:

Music
 Dirty Laundry (album), an Ian Hunter album
 "Dirty Laundry" (All Time Low song)
 "Dirty Laundry" (Bitter:Sweet song)
 "Dirty Laundry" (Don Henley song)
 "Dirty Laundry" (Kelly Rowland song)
 "Dirty Laundry" (Carrie Underwood song)

Film and television
 Dirty Laundry (2006 film), a 2006 drama film
 Dirty Laundry (2012 film), a 2012 Punisher fan film
 Dirty Laundry Live, an Australian TV series
 Dirty Laundry (TV series), a New Zealand drama TV series featuring Matthew Walker
 "Dirty Laundry" (Charlie Jade), an episode of the television series Charlie Jade
 "Dirty Laundry" (Cow and Chicken), an episode of the television series Cow and Chicken

Other
 Dirty Laundry (comic), a comic created by Robert Crumb

See also

 Dirty Linen (disambiguation)